Orlando is a city in Florida, United States.

Orlando may also refer to:

Places

South Africa
 Orlando, Soweto, a subdivision of Johannesburg

United States
 Orlando, Florida, a city
 Orlando International Airport, the busiest airport in the state
 Orlando Executive Airport, formerly Orlando Municipal Airport, Orlando Army Air Base and Orlando Air Force Base
 Orlando Health
 Orlando Health/Amtrak station
 Roman Catholic Diocese of Orlando
 Orlando, Kansas, a former settlement
 Orlando, Kentucky, an unincorporated community
 Orlando, Oklahoma, a town
 Orlando, West Virginia, an unincorporated community

Italy
 Monte Orlando, a wildlife park in Gaeta

People
 Orlando (given name)
 Orlando (surname)
 Roland (died 778), Frankish military leader and central character in a sequence of Italian verse romances (as "Orlando")

Fictional characters
 Orlando (As You Like It), a character in William Shakespeare's As You Like It
 Orlando, the title character of Orlando: A Biography, a novel by Virginia Woolf, and its film and stage adaptations
 Orlando (fictional cat), central figure in Katherine Hale's The Marmalade Cat 1938–1972 series of children's books 
 Orlando, a character from the comic book The Invisibles
 Orlando, a character from a comic book series The League of Extraordinary Gentlemen

Music
 Orlando (band), an English 1990s band, part of the Romo movement
 Orlando (opera), an opera by Handel
 Orlando, an opera by Nicola Porpora
 "Orlando", a song from the musical The Book of Mormon
 "Orlando", a song by the American rapper XXXTentacion from his album 17
 Orlando Consort, a British vocal consort
 Orlando Productions, a French record label

Transport
 , four Royal Navy ships
 , a United States Navy ship
 Chevrolet Orlando, a make of car
 Cantiere navale fratelli Orlando, Italian shipyard founded by Orlando brothers

Other uses
 Orlando: A Biography, a novel by Virginia Woolf
 Orlando (film), a 1992 film based on the novel
 Orlando (TV series), an early 1960s British thriller series
 Orlando (cat), the winner of a 2012 stock picking contest
 Orlando (horse), a British Thoroughbred racehorse
 Orlando Pirates F.C., a South African football club
 Orlando tangelo, a variety of citrus fruit
 Orlando Wines, an Australian winery

See also
 
 Orlanda (disambiguation)
 Olando
 Orando
 Owando